Big Falls of the Missisquoi Natural Area is an Orleans County, Vermont recreation area for swimming, fishing, and sight-seeing. The area also has a lot of old-growth hemlock plants and pine trees. Classified as a Vermont Natural Area protected site, the area is managed by the Vermont Department of Forests, Parks and Recreation.

Originating from its headwaters in Lowell, the falls have an estimated  drop. The somewhat isolated acreage has always been a popular picnic and recreation spot for local residents. In the 1950s, the water rights were held by an out-of-state entity, when purchased by the Vermont Citizens Utilities Company, following an assessment by the United States Army Corps of Engineers that the falls held potential as a substantive source of output from an on-site hydroelectric plant. The area was subsequently deeded back to the state in 1996 after the utilities company abandoned its plans.

Sources

Further reading
Vermont Waterfalls: A Guide (2015), Russell Dunn,

External links
The Vermont River Conservancy

Geography of Orleans County, Vermont
Orleans County, Vermont
Protected areas of Orleans County, Vermont